The Canary Islands derby is any football match contested between Spanish sides UD Las Palmas and CD Tenerife, who are regarded as the top two sides in the Canary Islands. World Soccer Magazine rated it as one of the 50 greatest rivalries in the world, and it is considered one of the most important derbies in Spain.

History 

The two teams, based on different islands, have been the Canary Islands' top two sides virtually since their establishment. Both sides have experienced spells in Spain's top division, La Liga. UD Las Palmas' greatest successes came in the 1960s and 70s, in a period when they came runners-up in La Liga just behind Real Madrid and in the Spanish Cup (losing to FC Barcelona in the final), competing in the Inter-Cities Fairs Cup (now UEFA Europe League) in 1969, and UEFA cup two times in 1972 and 1977. Tenerife's greatest successes came in the 1990s; they recorded their best ever league finish in 1992–93 and in 1995–96, in which they finished 5th. In 1996–97, they reached the semi-finals of the UEFA Cup, losing to eventual winners Schalke 04.

Stadia

UD Las Palmas 

UD Las Palmas play their home games at the Estadio Gran Canaria which has a capacity of 31,250. Located in the island's capital city of Las Palmas, the stadium is the biggest in the Canary Islands. In 2007 it hosted a Spain international friendly against Northern Ireland, which Spain won 1-0 with a goal from Xavi.

CD Tenerife 

CD Tenerife play their home games at the Estadio Heliodoro Rodríguez López which holds 23,000. Located in the island's capital city of Santa Cruz, it has hosted four Spain internationals, against Germany, Switzerland, Poland and Slovakia respectively.

Head to head 

There have been 64 official Canary Island derbies. 25 were drawn, UD Las Palmas won 24, and CD Tenerife won 17.

Las Palmas stats 

 Wins: 24
 Draws: 25
 Defeats: 17
 Goals scored: 77
 Goals conceded: 66

Tenerife stats 

 Wins: 17
 Draws: 25
 Defeats: 24
 Goals scored: 66
 Goals conceded: 77

All-time results
League

Copa de Canarias 
The Copa de Canarias is a friendly tournament played between Las Palmas and Tenerife since 2011 in a double-leg format. Since 2012, the tournament is sponsored by Mahou and receives the name of Copa Mahou Canarias.

In 2018, it was approved to reduce the tournament to a single game.

Notes

Kits 

UD Las Palmas play in yellow shirts with blue shorts and blue socks.

C.D. Tenerife play in blue and white shirts with blue shorts and white socks.

References

External links 
 http://www.worldfootball.net/teams/cd-tenerife/ud-las-palmas/11/
 https://web.archive.org/web/20190605024317/http://www.spanishfootball.info/2011/01/in-focus-the-canary-islands-derby/

Football rivalries in Spain
CD Tenerife
Football in the Canary Islands
UD Las Palmas
Recurring sporting events established in 1950